The Colombian Classic is a men's professional golf tournament held in Colombia and has been part of the PGA Tour Latinoamérica schedule since 2012.

The tournament was first played on PGA Tour Latinoamérica from 26 November to 2 December 2012 as the "Arturo Calle Colombian Coffee Classic Presentado por Avianca" at Club Campestre de Cali. The inaugural winner of the event was Sebastián Fernández.

Winners

References

External links
Coverage on the PGA Tour Latinoamérica official site

PGA Tour Latinoamérica events
Golf tournaments in Colombia
Recurring sporting events established in 2012
2012 establishments in Colombia